The 1978 Ohio Bobcats football team was an American football team that represented Ohio University in the Mid-American Conference (MAC) during the 1978 NCAA Division I-A football season. In their first and only season under head coach Bob Kappes, the Bobcats compiled a 3–8 record (3–5 against MAC opponents), finished in a tie for fifth place in the MAC, and were outscored by all opponents by a combined total of 246 to 120.  They played their home games in Peden Stadium in Athens, Ohio.

Schedule

References

Ohio
Ohio Bobcats football seasons
Ohio Bobcats football